The 2018–19 Western Kentucky Hilltoppers men's basketball team represented Western Kentucky University during the 2018–19 NCAA Division I men's basketball season. The Hilltoppers, led by head coach Rick Stansbury in his third season, played their home games at E. A. Diddle Arena in Bowling Green, Kentucky as fifth-year members of Conference USA.  The team finished the season tied for 2nd place in the conference and were defeated in the championship game of the conference tournament.

Previous season
The Hilltoppers finished the 2017–18 season with 27–11, 14–4 in C-USA play to finish in third place. They defeated UAB and Old Dominion to advance to the championship game of the C-USA tournament where they lost to Marshall. They received an at-large bid to the National Invitation Tournament where they defeated Boston College, USC, and Oklahoma State to advance to the semifinals where they lost to Utah.

Offseason

Departures

Incoming transfers

2018 recruiting class

Roster

Schedule and results

|-
!colspan=9 style=| Exhibition

|-
!colspan=9 style=| Non-conference regular season

|-
!colspan=12 style=| Conference USA regular season

|-
!colspan=9 style=| Conference USA Tournament

Source

See also
2018–19 Western Kentucky Lady Toppers basketball team

References

Western Kentucky Hilltoppers basketball seasons
WKU
WKU
WKU